Sleigh Bells may refer to:

 Sleigh bells, a type of bell which produces a distinctive 'jingle' sound, especially in large numbers. 
 Sleigh Bells (band), a band from New York
 Sleigh Bells (film), a 1928 animated film